The U.S. Post Office in Demopolis, Alabama is a historic post office. It was built in 1914 in a Jeffersonian Neoclassical  style.  The facade is granite and brick with five arched bays, the three central bays feature Palladian windows.  The roof line is crowned with a vasiform balustrade.  The interior is marble.  The building was added to the National Register of Historic Places on July 28, 1984, due to its architectural significance.

See also 
List of United States post offices

References

External links

National Register of Historic Places in Marengo County, Alabama
Government buildings completed in 1914
Demopolis
Neoclassical architecture in Alabama
Buildings and structures in Demopolis, Alabama